Llanfyrnach Rural District was an administrative division of Pembrokeshire, Wales.

Creation
Llanfyrnach Rural District Council was created in 1894 from the part of Newcastle in Emlyn Poor Law Union situated in Pembrokeshire, and consisted of six civil parishes: Capel Colman, Castellan, Clydau, Llanfyrnach, Penrydd and West Cilrhedyn.  It continued to be administered from Newcastle Emlyn.

Purpose
The Council comprised councillors and a chairman, and its responsibilities included sanitary services, sewerage, refuse collection, maintaining local roads, cemeteries and parks, licensing of public entertainments, water supply and housing. It became a rating authority in 1925. Rural District Councils were administered by a number of committees and by appointed officers including a Clerk, Treasurer, Public Health Inspector, Housing Officer, Surveyor and Rating Officer.

Abolition
The Council was abolished in 1934, when it was amalgamated with St Dogmells RD to form Cemaes RD (which itself was abolished in 1974 following local government reorganisation and its functions were assumed by Preseli Pembrokeshire District Council).

Records
The records of the Council are held by Pembrokeshire Record Office in Haverfordwest.

References

Rural districts of Wales
History of Pembrokeshire